L'Espérance Airport , also known as Grand Case Airport, is a public use airport located in Grand Case, on the French side of the Caribbean island of Saint Martin. The airport is mainly used for flights by regional passenger aircraft (ATR) flying to Guadeloupe and Saint Barth, as well as used by private aircraft. It is the second and smaller airport of Saint Maarten, after Princess Juliana International Airport (SXM) which is located on the Dutch side of the island.

Grand Case airport is managed by EDEIS, a major player in airport operations and engineering in France where it manages 18 airports.

In 2017, the renovation of the airport was completed that included a modernized terminal building, fire station upgrade, extended parking apron, and new control tower. In 2018 a new hangar for line maintenance purposes was completed.

The airport targets for more than 200,000 passengers movements a year.

Tower
PJIA air traffic control manages  of airspace around the airport. Besides providing approach, tower and ground control at PJIA, Juliana air traffic services also provides approach control for Grand Case airport.

Runway and facilities
Incoming aircraft approach the island on short final for runway 12 over the bay of Grand-Case, with a corresponding view. When wind direction changes, which is common, incoming airplanes approach the island on short final for runway 30, in the opposite direction.

Larger aircraft such as the ATR 72-500 powerback after lining up on the runway for departure, due to the short runway.

The regional Espérance Airport at Grand Case allows the quickest transfers for commercial inter-island aircraft and for private aircraft. Operators are required to send a flight request to EDEIS FBO SERVICE.

Airlines and destinations

The following commercial airlines provide scheduled passenger service:

Statistics

Joint border control with the Kingdom of the Netherlands
In 1994, the Kingdom of the Netherlands and France signed the Franco-Dutch treaty on Saint Martin border controls, which allows for joint Franco-Dutch border controls on so-called "risk flights". After some delay, the treaty was ratified in November 2006 in the Netherlands, and subsequently entered into force on 1 August 2007. Though the treaty is now in force, its provisions are not yet implemented as the working group specified in the treaty is not yet installed.

References

Airports in the Collectivity of Saint Martin
Grand Case